is the 9th and final single by the Japanese idol girl group Onyanko Club. It was released in Japan on August 21, 1987.
It was also the only single to be released by Kirigirisu Records.

Outline
The single was subsequently used as a retirement song for members 14 (Harumi Tomikawa), 19  (Ruriko Nagata), 22 (Mako Shiraishi), 28 (Mutsumi Yokota), and 33 (Tomoko Fukawa), as they would all go on to retire from show business.

The B side, Watashi o Yoroshiku, contained the same main vocals as the A side.

Track listing

Charts

Weekly charts

References 

Onyanko Club songs
1987 songs
1987 singles
Songs with lyrics by Yasushi Akimoto
Pony Canyon singles